World Rugby League is based in Argentina. It is a confederation of recognised national Federations.  F.e. Lega Italiana Rugby Football League is recognised by CONI. 

It was formed in 2016 after a meeting between non-RLIF recognised Rugby League Federations in Florence. The first Assembly took place in Athens, in 2017.

See also

References

External links

Rugby league governing bodies
International sports organizations
Rugby league in Greece
Sports organizations established in 2016